A&G, AG, Ag or ag may refer to

Businesses and organizations 
 A&G Railroad (former reporting mark AG)
 Action Group (Nigeria), a political party during the Nigerian First Republic
 Aktiengesellschaft, a German type of corporation
 Assemblies of God, the world's largest Pentecostal organization
 Associated Group, a Pakistani company
 Astronomische Gesellschaft, a German astronomical society
 IATA code for Aruba Airlines

Entertainment 
 American Gladiators (1989–1996 TV series)
 American Gladiators (2008 TV series)

Government and military 
 Adjutant general, the Army branch responsible for personnel
 Administrator-General of South West Africa, the head of government in Namibia prior to independence in 1990
 Aerographer's mate, a rating or specialty in the US Navy that deals with weather and oceanography
 American Holland-class submarine (Amerikansky Golland), a class of Imperial Russian submarines
 Army green, the color of the US Army service uniform and those of several other militaries
 Attorney general, government lawyer or law enforcement officer in several legal systems 
 Miscellaneous Auxiliary, a hull classification for a type of US Navy support ship

People 
 A. G. Weinberger, Romanian musician and singer/songwriter
 Aurela Gaçe (born 1974), Albanian singer
 Adriano Goldschmied, Italian fashion designer
 Adrianne Gonzalez (born 1977), American musician who goes by the stage name AG
Alex Gonzaga (born 1988), Filipina singer who sometimes uses the abbreviated nickname AG
Ariana Grande, an American musician 
 Showbiz and A.G., a hip-hop MC (short for "André the Giant")
A. G. Cook, a British pop music producer

Places 
 .ag, the ccTLD for Antigua and Barbuda
 Aargau, a Swiss canton
 Ág, a village in Hungary
 Province of Agrigento, a Province of Italy (ISO 3166-2:IT code AG)
 Antigua and Barbuda, a twin-island nation lying between the Caribbean Sea and the Atlantic Ocean
 Argeș County, a county in Romania (ISO 3166-2:RO code AG)

Science and technology 
 Silver, symbol Ag, a chemical element
 Agamous, a gene which plays a role in the ABC model of flower development
 Allocation group, a sub-volume in a computer file system
 Anion gap, a value calculated from the results of several medical tests
 Antigen, a substance that stimulates an immune response
 Astronomische Gesellschaft, a German astronomical society
 Attogram, an SI derived unit of mass
 Attribute grammar, in formal language theory
 Inequality of arithmetic and geometric means, in mathematics
 American Holland-class submarine (Amerikansky Golland), a class of Imperial Russian submarines
 Miscellaneous Auxiliary, a hull classification for a type of US Navy support ship

Other uses 
 Anno Graecorum, the Seleucid era, an ancient calendar
 Atuagagdliutit/Grønlandsposten, a newspaper in Greenland
 AG, dominical letter of a leap year starting on Sunday

See also
 
 
 Agee (disambiguation)